The 2022 Gwangju Open was a professional tennis tournament played on hard courts. It was the 5th edition of the tournament which was part of the 2022 ATP Challenger Tour. It took place in Gwangju, South Korea between 3 and 9 October 2022.

Singles main-draw entrants

Seeds

 1 Rankings as of 26 September 2022.

Other entrants
The following players received wildcards into the singles main draw:
  Hong Seong-chan
  Park Ui-sung
  Shin San-hui

The following player received entry into the singles main draw using a protected ranking:
  Marc Polmans

The following players received entry from the qualifying draw:
  Chung Yun-seong
  Jason Jung
  Lee Duck-hee
  Naoki Nakagawa
  Nam Ji-sung
  Mukund Sasikumar

The following player received entry as a lucky loser:
  Keegan Smith

Champions

Singles

  Zsombor Piros def.  Emilio Gómez 6–2, 6–4.

Doubles

  Nicolás Barrientos /  Miguel Ángel Reyes-Varela def.  Yuki Bhambri /  Saketh Myneni 2–6, 6–3, [10–6].

References

2022 ATP Challenger Tour
Gwangju Open
2022 in South Korean sport
October 2022 sports events in South Korea